The 2019 Texas Southern Tigers football team represents Texas Southern University in the 2019 NCAA Division I FCS football season. The Tigers are led by first-year head coach Clarence McKinney and play their home games at a BBVA Compass Stadium in Houston, Texas as members of the West Division of the Southwestern Athletic Conference (SWAC).

Previous season
The Tigers finished the 2018 season 2–9, 1–6 in SWAC play to finish in fourth place in the West Division.

Preseason

Preseason polls
The SWAC released their preseason poll on July 16, 2019. The Tigers were picked to finish in fourth place in the West Division.

Preseason all–SWAC teams
The Tigers placed two players on the preseason all–SWAC teams.

Offense

2nd team

Tren'Davian Dixon – WR

Defense

2nd team

Julian Marcantel – LB

Roster

Schedule

Game summaries

Prairie View A&M

at Incarnate Word

at Louisiana

at Houston Baptist

at Alabama A&M

Missouri S&T

vs. Southern

at Mississippi Valley State

at Grambling State

Alabama State

at Arkansas–Pine Bluff

References

Texas Southern
Texas Southern Tigers football seasons
College football winless seasons
Texas Southern Tigers football